Pale Sun, Crescent Moon is the fifth studio album by Canadian country rock band Cowboy Junkies, released in 1993. It was the band's last album of new material for RCA Records, although a live album and a greatest hits compilation were subsequently released on the label. Canadian guitarist Ken Myhr appears on every track on this album.

Album development 
The Cowboy Junkies created the album within months of getting off the road from the Black Eyed Man tour. While touring, Michael Timmins started work on several new songs, and after getting home he cleaned up and finished up the tracks. Ken Myhr, who had been on the last tour with the band, was invited to join the band in working out arrangements for the songs.  In April over the Easter weekend the four band members and Ken went to Studio 306 in Toronto, operated by Bob Cobban, to record the basic tracks in three very long sessions. The band had worked with Cobban at Studio 306 before when recording "Lost My Driving Wheel". After the initial sessions, the band started work on the overdub sessions, which were spread out over the next few weeks. In this cycle, Michael Timmins and Myhr added more guitar, Margo added some harmonies, Jeff Bird added embellishments, and Richard Bell added keyboard. Richard Bell had been in the industry for a while, working with The Band, Big Brother and the Holding Company, and can be heard on Janis Joplin's album Pearl, and he added a classic style of rock with his piano and organ work during the recording sessions. The album from conception to final mixing is the one of the quickest the band created. One goal with the album was just to raise the volume a bit from the Junkies earlier albums. With every album, they try to add a different element, and for this album, they opened the album with a power chord.

Pale Sun, Crescent Moon is about male-female relationships. The track show different faces of relationships, showcasing mystical with "Crescent Moon", reality with "First Recollection" and "Ring on the Sill", romantic with "Anniversary Song" and "White Sail", investigates dark corners with "Seven Years", "Pale Sun", and "The Post", moves on to metaphysical with "Cold Tea Blues", delves into the unexplainable with "Hard to Explain" and "Hunted", and finally ends with a song showcasing the distrust between one man and one woman in "Floorboard Blues". Margo Timmins describes the theme of the album as " "is that there is love and there is all that conspires to steal love away."

Track listing

Personnel 
Cowboy Junkies
Margo Timmins – vocals
Michael Timmins – guitar
Alan Anton – bass
Peter Timmins – drums

Additional Musicians
Jeff Bird – harmonica, mandolin, 8-string bass, percussion
Ken Myhr – lead guitar
Richard Bell – piano, organ

Production
Michael Timmins - producer
Bob Ludwig - mastered
Robert Cobban - engineer, mixed by
Colin Caddies - assistant engineer
Open Circle Design - design
David Houghton - Art Direction
Juan Sánchez Cotán - Cover illustration

References

External links 

1993 albums
Cowboy Junkies albums
RCA Records albums